London United may refer to:

London United (basketball)
London United Busways
London United Tramways